"A Slow Descent" a song by Australian band, The Butterfly Effect. It was released in June 2006 as the lead single from the band's second studio album, Imago. The single peaked at number 9 on the ARIA Charts.

Track listing
 "A Slow Descent" (Radio Edit)
 "Phoenix"

Charts

References

The Butterfly Effect (band) songs
2006 singles
2006 songs